is a  private junior college in Toyooka, Hyōgo, Japan. The junior college was established as a women's junior college in 1967. It became coeducational in 1989.

Departments
Department of childcare

External links

 Toyooka Junior College

Japanese junior colleges
Private universities and colleges in Japan
Universities and colleges in Hyōgo Prefecture
Toyooka, Hyōgo